Axel Wegner (born 3 June 1963 in Demmin, Mecklenburg-Vorpommern) is a German sport shooter and Olympic champion. He won a gold medal in skeet shooting at the 1988 Summer Olympics in Seoul.

References

1963 births
Living people
People from Demmin
German male sport shooters
Skeet shooters
Olympic shooters of East Germany
Olympic shooters of Germany
Olympic gold medalists for East Germany
Shooters at the 1988 Summer Olympics
Shooters at the 1992 Summer Olympics
Shooters at the 1996 Summer Olympics
Shooters at the 2004 Summer Olympics
Shooters at the 2008 Summer Olympics
Olympic medalists in shooting
Medalists at the 1988 Summer Olympics
Sportspeople from Mecklenburg-Western Pomerania